The Edificio Carrión or Edificio Capitol is a building in central Madrid, Spain. An outstanding example of the expressionist-leaning trend within the wider scope of rationalist architecture in Spain, the building has become an icon of both the Gran Vía and the city.

The project was entrusted to Vicente Eced Eced and Luis Martínez Feduchi, who were influenced by the November Group and most specifically by Erich Mendelsohn's works. Building works started on 11 April 1931.

The building was inaugurated on 15 October 1933.

Depicted in many artistic works, the building's façade was prominently used as setting of the movie El día de la bestia. The building was declared Bien de Interés Cultural in 2018.

References 

Buildings and structures in Palacio neighborhood, Madrid
Bien de Interés Cultural landmarks in Madrid
Gran Vía (Madrid)